The following is a list of Arizona Wildcats men's basketball head coaches. The Wildcats have had 18 coaches in their 115-season history. One Arizona coach has been enshrined in the Naismith Memorial Basketball Hall of Fame: Lute Olson. The current head coach of Arizona Wildcat is Tommy Lloyd.

Career coaching records
Source:

Notes
* Only intrasquad games were played in 1905–06.

+ Record for the 1999 and 2008 were vacated by NCAA due to NCAA infractions. Actual on-court records was 589-188 for Lute Olson and 19–15 for Kevin O'Neil.

^ Rosborough served as head coach for five games during the 2000–01 campaign while Olson took a leave of absence. Arizona was 28–8 overall and 15–3 in Pac-10 play that season.

++ O'Neill served as interim head coach while Olson missed the season due to a leave of absence.

+++ Pennell served as interim head coach following Olson's retirement in October 2008.

++++ The NCAA vacated 32 wins from the 2016–17 season, and 18 wins from the 2017–18 season as a result of the 2017–18 NCAA men's basketball corruption scandal.  The players involved in the scandal played in every game in the 2016–17 & 23 games in the 2017–18 season, resulting in a 9–8 record.

 An asterisk (*) denotes a season currently in progress.

† – Inducted into the Naismith Memorial Basketball Hall of Fame.

References

Arizona

Arizona Wildcats men's basketball coaches